Eileen Fenton was born in Dewsbury in 1928. On 26th September 1950, she became the first woman to swim the English Channel. Fenton completed the swim as a competitor in the First Daily Mail Channel Race. There were 24 competitors in the race and less than half of these finished. She finished in a time of 15hrs 31mins, and received a winner's cheque of £1000.

In 2019, she received an MBE in the Queen's Birthday honours for voluntary service to Long Distance and Competitive Swimming Coaching in Yorkshire and Great Britain.

References 

English Channel swimmers
Members of the Order of the British Empire
1928 births
Living people